Aeronautical Engineering Review was a journal published by the Institute of the Aeronautical Sciences.

History
The Institute of the Aeronautical Sciences started on 1933. It was titled the Journal of the Aeronautical Sciences. It became a monthly publication in 1935. The journal contained a section called "News from the Institute", that contained meeting notices, announcements, and obituaries. By 1944 this information was transferred to the Aeronautical Engineering Review.

References

Aerospace engineering journals
Defunct journals of the United States
Publications established in 1933